Hylephila signata is a species of butterfly in the family Hesperiidae. It was first described by Émile Blanchard in 1852. It is found in Chile, Brazil and Argentina.

References

 Hylephila signata in butterfliesofamerica

Butterflies described in 1852
Hesperiini